Tok Tokab (also Romanized as Tok Tokāb; also known as Towk Towk Āb and Tūk Tūkāb) is a village in Hoseyniyeh Rural District, Alvar-e Garmsiri District, Andimeshk County, Khuzestan Province, Iran. At the 2006 census, its population was 166, in 34 families.

References 

Populated places in Andimeshk County